Tim Bredbury (born 25 April 1963) is a former Hong Kong professional footballer. Bredbury is a UEFA A/AFC A licensed coach and is currently the head coach of Hong Kong Third Division club Kowloon Cricket Club.

Early life
Tim Bredbury was born in Hong Kong to British parents from Liverpool. His father John moved to Hong Kong as a fireman working for the Hong Kong Government. Bredbury went to Glenealy School and King George V School. As a talented sportsman, Bredbury represented Hong Kong Schools in rugby (1979 Rosslyn Park World Schools 7's), hockey and swimming. Bredbury has three siblings who have also represented Hong Kong at hockey and rugby.

Professional playing career
Bredbury began his professional football career with Liverpool in 1979, signing as an apprentice professional. After two years, Bredbury was offered full professional terms on a one-year contract.

Bredbury stayed at Liverpool  for 3 years, winning the Central League twice, the Liverpool Senior Cup and the Nice International Invitation Tournament. In addition to representing the club's A and B sides in the early years.

At the end of his contract, Bredbury was then approached by Ryoden. He decided to take the offer and return home to Hong Kong. He scored 13 goals in 4 games and was soon signed up with Hong Kong league giants Seiko, playing alongside the likes of Arie Haan, Theo de Jong, Dick Nanninga, René van der Kerkhoff, Jonny Rep, Peter Bodak and Benny Wendt in a highly successful 2-year period winning the league twice.

Between 1982 and 1999, Bredbury played for various clubs in Hong Kong, such as Hong Kong Rangers, South China, Lai Sun, Frankwell, Sing Tao and Instant-Dict, as well as Australian club Sydney Olympic FC and Malaysian clubs Selangor FA and Sabah FA.

Bredbury was the joint top goalscorer in Hong Kong on two separate occasions and finished tied (with Dale Tempest) in the Hong Kong First Division League with 21 goals during the 1990–1991 season with Lai Sun FC before leaving Hong Kong and signing for Sydney Olympic in Australia.

In his debut season Bredbury also finished as joint top scorer (with Kimon Taliadoros) in the National Soccer League with Sydney Olympic FC during the 1991–1992 season scoring 15 goals in 24 appearances.

Bredbury also had two successful seasons playing in Malaysia with giants Selangor FC and second division side Sabah FC. At Sabah, Bredbury helped the club reach the FA Cup Final, the first time a second division side had achieved this feat.

At club level, Bredbury played against top club sides from around the world, including Corinthians, Lucky Gold Star (now Seoul), Odense, Sampdoria, A.C. Milan, Everton, Aston Villa, Coventry, Sparta Prague, Brøndby and Chelsea.

In 1986, Bredbury was invited to join the Hong Kong national team and, in a career that spanned over 10 years, he played in the World Cup qualifying rounds, Olympics qualifying rounds and Asian Games in Yokohama, Japan. He played over 30 representative games scoring 14 goals.

Bredbury was also a regular member of the Hong Kong League XI side competing in the Carlsberg Cup and Dynasty Cup tournaments playing against such sides as Denmark, Paraguay (where he was "Man of the Match"), Yugoslavia, Japan, South Korea, Nigeria, Sweden, Romania, Switzerland, China.

In addition to his professional playing career, Bredbury is also a fully qualified English Football Association coach and gained his UEFA A Licence in December 2011 through the English Football Association. In 2016, he also received recognition through the AFC and now holds the equivalent license.

Bredbury is a member of the English Football Association Coaches Association and also a former member of the English Professional Footballers Association.

Post-playing career
Bredbury worked as a marketing manager, professional coach, sports journalist, event organiser and television presenter on ATV's World channel.

Professional coaching career

La Salle College
In 2005, Bredbury was appointed head coach of the schools A, B and C grade teams. In that season, La Salle were the overall School Champions in football.

Rangers
In 2006–07 season, Bredbury secured his first professional head coaching position with Rangers FC in the HKFA 1st division.

Tai Po FC
In 2007–08 season, Bredbury was appointed head coach of Tai Po in the Hong Kong First Division.

Second stint at Rangers
In 2007–08 season, Bredbury rejoined Rangers FC in the Hong Kong First Division. After his second stint with Rangers, Bredbury joined the highly successful Kitchee/FC Barcelona Escola program.

Third stint at Rangers
In 2011–12 season, Rangers announced that Bredbury would become head coach. During his third stint, Biu Chun Rangers also won the HKFA Reserve League.

Sun Hei
In 2012/13 season, Sun Hei SC announced that Bredbury would take over as first team coach in preparation for the 2012–13 season and the AFC Cup Competition.

Tai Chung
In 2012/13 season Bredbury joined Tai Chung FC, a feeder club for Kitchee in the Hong Kong Second Division.

HKFC
In 2016, Bredbury became head coach for the U18 HKFC Academy team playing in the HKFA Youth Leagues. 
Bredbury also coached the Hong Kong Football Club side in the 2016 Citibank International Soccer 7's Masters Tournament.

Kitchee
In 2017, Bredbury became head coach for the U14 Kitchee Football Club Academy team playing in the HKFA Youth Leagues. During his management Kitchee U14 won the HKFA U14 First Division.

Discovery Bay Masters FC
In 2018, Bredbury became head coach for the Discovery Bay FC Masters (DBFC) team playing in the HKFC International Soccer Sevens. DBFC won the Masters tournament without conceding a goal in the tournament.
In 2019, DBFC Masters also reached the final of the HKFC International Soccer Sevens Plate tournament.

Kowloon Cricket Club
In 2019, Bredbury became head coach for the Kowloon Cricket Club Dragons team playing in the Yau Yee League 1st Division.

Honours
 2 Central League Champions - UK 
 1 Liverpool Senior Cup Champions - UK
 1 Nice Invitation Cup Champions - Fra
 1 Second Division League Champions - HK 
 1 Junior Viceroy Cup Champions - HK
 7 First Division League Champions - HK 
 2 Lunar New Year Cup Champions - HK 
 5 Viceroy Cup Champions - HK
 2 Senior Shield Champions - HK
 4 FA Cup Champions - HK
 2 Seven a Side Champions - HK 
 2 Top Goal Scorer - HK   
 1 NSL Joint Top Goal Scorer - HK

References

External links
 Tim Bredbury NSL career profile
 
 Tim Bradbury Interview

1963 births
Living people
Hong Kong people of British descent
Hong Kong footballers
Hong Kong football managers
Hong Kong international footballers
Hong Kong expatriate footballers
Hong Kong First Division League players
Double Flower FA players
Liverpool F.C. players
South China AA players
Seiko SA players
Expatriate footballers in Malaysia
Sydney Olympic FC players
National Soccer League (Australia) players
Sabah F.C. (Malaysia) players
Selangor FA players
Hong Kong expatriates in Australia
Alumni of King George V School, Hong Kong
Association football forwards
Footballers at the 1994 Asian Games
Asian Games competitors for Hong Kong